WR 24 (HD 93131) is a Wolf-Rayet star in the constellation Carina. It is one of the most luminous stars known. At the edge of naked eye visibility it is also one of the brightest Wolf Rayet stars in the sky.

The spectrum of WR 24 has the characteristic strong nitrogen and helium emission lines of a WN star, but also lines of hydrogen that show Doppler-displaced absorption components. The lowest ionisation nitrogen emission lines are strongest, with NV lines being very weak. The HeI lines are weaker than the HeII lines, leading to a WN6ha spectral class. The spectral type is annotated with a letter w, indicating weaker emission than for a typical WN6 star.

WR 24 is thought to be a member of the open cluster Collinder 228, sometimes considered to be just an extension of the rich cluster Trumpler 16. It lies on the southwestern side of the Carina Nebula. Collinder 228 and the Carina Nebula are approximately 2.2 kpc away.

WR 24 has been reported to vary in brightness by about 0.02 magnitudes. Analysis of Hipparcos photometry shows an amplitude of 0.082 magnitudes and a primary period of 4.76 days. It has not yet been assigned a variable star designation in the General Catalogue of Variable Stars and is still formally listed as a suspected variable.

The hydrogen-rich WN stars have been referred to as WNL stars or as WNH stars since they do not necessarily have late nitrogen-sequence spectra. They are systematically more massive and more luminous than stars with similar spectra but lacking nitrogen. These stars are proposed to be young hydrogen-burning stars, effectively main sequence objects, rather than post-supergiant stars. WR 24 is calculated to have 44% hydrogen in its atmosphere. The cluster Collinder 228 is thought to be around 6.78 million years old. The WR-type spectra are caused because helium and nitrogen and convected to the surface by the extreme temperature gradients caused by the CNO cycle in the core, and then expelled by powerful stellar winds.

References

External links
 Collinder 228 SEDS.org

Carina (constellation)
Wolf–Rayet stars
J10435225-6007040
Durchmusterung objects
093131
052488
Suspected variables